Felipe Mendez was born around 1897 in San Juan, Argentina and participated as a paleontological collector at the 2nd Captain Marshall Field Paleontological Expedition in 1926.

The international team included Elmer S. Riggs (Leader and Photographer), Robert C. Thorne (Collector) and Rudolf Stahlecker (Collector). The expedition started in April 1926 and ended in November 1926. The purpose was geological fossil collecting in Catamarca, Argentina. The expedition was successful, and new species such as Stahleckeria were found during this collaboration.

External links 
 Historic photographs by The Field Museum Library

References 

1890s births
Argentine paleontologists
Year of death missing